Colin Anthony Greenall (born 30 December 1963) is an English former professional footballer who made over 600 Football League appearances between 1980 and 1999. Starting his career at Blackpool as an apprentice, Greenall had spells at Gillingham, Oxford United, Bury, Preston North End, Chester City and Lincoln City before finishing his career at his hometown club, Wigan Athletic.

Playing career

Blackpool
Billinge-born Greenall made his professional debut with Blackpool on 23 September 1980, at the age of 16 years and 237 days, becoming the club's then-youngest-ever league player (a record broken by Trevor Sinclair in 1989). Three days later, he appeared in a League Cup game against Everton at Goodison Park.

Greenall was one of a host of young players brought to Blackpool by Alan Ball during his short managerial reign at the club. Unlike most of the others, however, he remained at the club for years and developed into a dependable defender. He eventually took over the central role, combining with captain Steve Hetzke and Mike Conroy to form a successful defensive partnership.

Greenall won England Youth honours and, at 20, was voted the Fourth Division's Player of the Year by the PFA.

Gillingham
After 183 league appearances in just over five years, Greenall had a contractual dispute with Blackpool, and in September 1986 he moved to Third Division Gillingham for £40,000.

Oxford United
Greenall joined Oxford United in February 1988 for £235,000, and the U's soon made him skipper following the departure of Tommy Caton, as he enjoyed a brief taste of top-flight football before they were relegated at the end of the season.

Bury and Preston North End
In July 1990, he moved to Bury for £100,000 after an initial loan spell at Gigg Lane, before departing for Preston North End during 1991–92 – a move in his favour as Preston narrowly beat the drop from Division Three while Bury were relegated. Preston would follow suit 12 months later, however.

Latter years
After a year at Chester City, where he won promotion and player of the season in 1993–94, and a spell with Lincoln City, Greenall joined Wigan Athletic in 1995. At Wigan, he helped guide the team to Third Division success as an ever-present captain in 1997. After coming out of retirement, Greenall made his Wembley debut in 1999 when he defied his advancing years to help Wigan beat Millwall 1–0 to win the Football League Trophy.

As of 2021, Greenall summarises for football commentaries on BBC Radio Lancashire.

Coaching career
In 2001, Greenall became caretaker manager of Wigan for six games, losing only once, but he did not get the job permanently and lost his coaching job at Wigan shortly afterwards. He returned to playing with Rossendale United while searching for new coaching opportunities.

In June 2002 he was appointed Head of Youth Development at Rochdale and in June 2004 Director of the Centre of Excellence at Rochdale. In August 2005 he was appointed to the role of Coach Education Manager at the Lancashire FA.

Honours
Blackpool
PFA Fourth Division Player of the Year: 1980–81

Chester City
Player of the Season: 1993–94.

Wigan Athletic
Football League Division Three (IV) champions: 1996–97.
Football League Trophy winners: 1998–99.

References

External links
Colin Greenall: Latics Legends. Wigan Athletic Official Club Site
Colin Greenall's career stats at Soccerbase

●  Playfair football annuals 1981-82 to 1999-2000

1963 births
Living people
People from Billinge, Merseyside
English footballers
English football managers
Footballers from Wigan
Blackpool F.C. players
Gillingham F.C. players
Oxford United F.C. players
Bury F.C. players
Preston North End F.C. players
Chester City F.C. players
Lincoln City F.C. players
Wigan Athletic F.C. players
Wigan Athletic F.C. managers
English Football League players
Association football defenders